Daniel Moreira (born 8 August 1977) is a French former professional footballer who played as a striker.

Club career
Born in Maubeuge, Moreira started his career with Valenciennes FC before moving to Guingamp. He finished as the runners-up of the 1997 Coupe de France playing for them.

In 1998, he transferred to RC Lens. He won the Coupe de la Ligue with the Les Sang et Or in 1999, scoring the winning goal in the final against Metz, and got very close from winning the national championship in 2002. After spending six years at Stade Félix Bollaert, he was rewarded with a move to Toulouse FC. In the 2005–06 season, he formed a formidable attacking partnership alongside Brazilian-born Tunisian forward Santos, scoring 15 goals between them in Ligue 1.

On 22 June 2006, Moreira agreed to join Stade Rennais for a fee of €5,500,000.

Moreira made a less than impressive season at his new club, not scoring after 29 appearances (17 of them as starter). In 2008, he was then loaned to recently promoted Grenoble where, on 9 August, he scored a goal for his debut against Sochaux at the 89th minute to ensure an unexpected 2–1 away win for Grenoble's first Ligue 1 game for 43 years.

In August 2009 he transferred to US Boulogne. After a complicated knee injury, he retired from professional football in December 2010.

International career
Moreira was born in France, and is of Portuguese descent. Moreira has earned 3 caps in his career, making his debut for the France national team on 20 November 2002 in a 3–0 win against Serbia.

Honours
Guingamp
 UEFA Intertoto Cup winner: 1996
 Coupe de France runner-up: 1997

Lens
 Coupe de la Ligue: 1999

References

External links
 
 
 Daniel Moreira's profile, stats & pics

1977 births
Living people
People from Maubeuge
Sportspeople from Nord (French department)
Association football forwards
French people of Portuguese descent
French footballers
France youth international footballers
France international footballers
Valenciennes FC players
En Avant Guingamp players
RC Lens players
Toulouse FC players
Stade Rennais F.C. players
Grenoble Foot 38 players
US Boulogne players
Ligue 1 players
Ligue 2 players
Championnat National players
Footballers from Hauts-de-France